The Zadian Minaret  is a minaret in Zadian, Balkh Province in north Afghanistan. It is located in the remote region of the Dawlatabat District, in northwestern Balkh Province.

Etymology 
The word 'minaret' is Arabic (منارة) and usually refers to a tower next to a mosque from which the muezzin calls the faithful to prayer. However, it can also mean lighthouse. 

The minaret is nameless, so it is named after the village Zadian.

History 
The minaret was built by the Seljuk dynasty, during the 12th century. According to the Archaeological Gazetteer of Afghanistan, the minaret was built in 1108-09. However, some archaeological studies suggest that the date of the construction of the minaret is approximately around the year 760.

In the 12th century, the region was missed by Genghis Khan and the invading Mongols.

Archaeology has taken place in the district, including works by the French Archaeological Delegation in Afghanistan (DAFA).

As the minaret is climbable, local citizens have scaled the tower and some have fallen to their deaths in attempts.

Site 
The 25-meter high minaret was built in the 12th century and is made of sun-baked clay and plaster bricks. It is 18 meters in diameter. The structure has 64 stairs in it and there are carved calligraphic phrases in Kufic script.

Shrine of Hazrat Saleh 
Afghan pilgrims have visited the minaret due to the adjacent shrine a hundred feet away. The shrine of Hazrat Saleh is located by the minaret. The shrine is associated with the Islamic prophet Saleh. The site is also associated with the Arabian site, Mada'in Saleh, Saudi Arabia. The green-draped tomb of Saleh inside the shrine is facing east, while Islamic graves are arranged so that it faces Mecca, which is west of Afghanistan, suggesting pre-Islamic origins of the site. On the outside, there is an arched niche where pilgrims have left pieces of mud in the hope of a cure for skin ailments.

Inscriptional content 

 "In the name of God, the Merciful and Compassionate, Oh you believing people, called by the adhan on the day of Friday, try to pray to God. The building of this minaret - the great ruler - the trusted by the government and honor of the community, Abu Jafar Mohammed Ibn-Ali..."
 The rest of the inscription had been eroded.

Gallery

External links

References

Minarets in Afghanistan
Buildings and structures in Balkh Province
History of Balkh Province